The 1947 Portland Pilots football team was an American football team that represented the University of Portland as an independent during the 1947 college football season. In its second year under head coach Hal Moe, the team compiled a 1–8 record. The team played its home games at Multnomah Stadium in Portland, Oregon.

Players included Jim Sweeney, who played as an end for Portland's freshman team in 1947.

Schedule

References

Portland
Portland Pilots football seasons
Portland Pilots football
Portland Pilots football